OICC may refer to:

 Officer in Charge of Construction RVN, a United States military organization during the Vietnam War.
 Kermanshah Airport, Iran, by ICAO airport code